The Mackenzie-class destroyer was a class of warship used by the Royal Canadian Navy and Canadian Forces from the 1960s–1990s. Six such ships were envisioned, of which four were completed to this specification. The last two hulls were completed to the post DDH conversion  design (which included helicopter hangars); they were designated as the  instead. The four Mackenzie-class destroyers spent most of their service in the Pacific Ocean, used primarily in a training role. Their only significant update was the DELEX (destroyer life extension) program, which was completed between 1982 and 1985 and updated their navigational radar and their sonar.

Design and description

The initial design for what became known as the Mackenzie class was for an enlarged version of the St. Laurent class. Designed in 1957, they were to be  heavier,  longer and have engines that were  stronger than those installed in the St. Laurents. They would also have improved radar and sonar installed. Instead, budget issues forced a repeat of the previous , with changes intentionally minimized. Four ships were ordered in 1957, two more in 1958. However, costs for each of the ships rose to $28 million.

In 1959, the design of the final two ships of the class was altered to incorporate the changes made to the St. Laurent class. These two ships then became a separate class, known as the Annapolis class. The remaining four Mackenzies were essentially improved Restigouches, with improved habitability and better pre-wetting, bridge and weatherdeck fittings to better deal with extreme cold.

General characteristics
The destroyer escorts displaced  fully loaded and had a complement of 290.

The class was powered by two Babcock & Wilcox boilers connected to the two-shaft English-Electric geared steam turbines creating .

Armament
The most noticeable change for the Mackenzies was the replacement of the forward /50 calibre Mk 22 guns with a dual Vickers 3-inch/70 calibre Mk 6 gun mount and the presence of a fire-control director atop the bridge superstructure. The bridge was raised one full deck higher than on previous classes in order to see over the new gun mount. However, the 3-inch/70 caliber guns were unavailable when Qu'Appelle was being constructed and 3-inch/50 calibre guns were installed instead in the forward mount.

The guns had a rate of fire of 95–113 rounds per minute.

Two 3-inch/70 guns were placed in a Mark 6 mounting. The mounting could elevate to 90° with a 30°/sec elevation rate and a 60°/sec train rate. The guns were interchangeable with the American 3-inch/70 design, however the British mountings were considered superior.

The destroyers also had secondary armament of two American-produced 3-inch/50 calibre guns in a dual mount aft. The guns could fire 15 – 20 rounds per minute with a lifespan of 4,300 rounds.

The guns were placed in a Mk 22 mount. The mounting allowed the guns to elevate from −15° to 85°. The elevation and train rates were manually operated, though the mounts could train 360°.

For anti-submarine warfare, the class was provided with two Mk 10 Limbo mortars. Placed on stabilized mountings, the projectiles always entered the water at the same angle. They also had two single Mk.2 "K-gun" launchers for their Mark 43 torpedoes.

Sensors
The Mackenzies were equipped with one SPS-12 air search radar, one SPS-10B surface search radar and one Sperry Mk.2 navigation radar. For detection below the surface, the ships had one SQS-501 high frequency bottom profiler sonar, one SQS-503 hull mounted active search sonar, one SQS-502 high frequency mortar control sonar and one SQS-11 hull mounted active search
sonar.

DELEX refit
The DEstroyer Life EXtension (DELEX) refit was born out of the need to extend the life of the steam-powered destroyer escorts of the Canadian Navy in the 1980s until the next generation of surface ship was built. Encompassing all the classes based on the initial St. Laurent (the remaining St. Laurent, Restigouche,  Mackenzie, and Annapolis-class vessels), the DELEX upgrades were meant to improve their ability to combat modern Soviet submarines, and to allow them to continue to operate as part of NATO task forces. All of the ships in the class had their refits performed at Esquimalt, British Columbia.

The DELEX refit for the Mackenzie class was the same for the Improved Restigouche-class vessels. This meant that the ships would receive the new tactical data system ADLIPS, new radars, new fire control and satellite navigation. They exchanged the SQS-503 sonar for the newer SQS-505 model. The sonar dome was installed on the hull and there were further modifications to the SPS-12 air search radar.

They also received two triple mounts for  torpedo tubes that would use the new Mk 46 homing torpedo. The tubes were sited on the quarterdeck, replacing the Limbo mortars.

Ships

Service history

All four ships in the class were ordered from different shipyards. Mackenzie was laid down by Canadian Vickers of Montreal on 15 December 1958, followed by Yukon on 25 October 1959 by Burrard Dry Dock of Vancouver, Saskatchewan on 29 October 1959 by Victoria Machinery Depot Co. of Victoria, British Columbia and Qu'Appelle from Davie Shipbuilding of Lauzon, Quebec on 14 January 1960. They commissioned in a  different order, beginning with Mackenzie on 6 October 1962, Saskatchewan on 16 February 1963, Yukon on 25 May 1963 and Qu'Appelle on 14 September 1963.

Mackenzie spent the better part of her service life on the west coast of Canada, with the exception of her first year based at Halifax. Mackenzie had an uneventful career, spending most of her time as a training ship or performing general duties, such as port visits and naval exercises. She underwent her DELEX refit in 1985. The ship was paid off on 3 August 1993 and sunk as an artificial reef off Rum Island, near Sidney, British Columbia.

Saskatchewan was initially based on the east coast out of Halifax for a couple of months, then transferred to the west coast. In February 1970, she transferred back east and acted as the flagship for STANAVFORLANT, the standing NATO fleet during the Cold War. Once again, Saskatchewan transferred back to the west in 1973. The ship underwent her DELEX refit from 1985–86 and spent the rest of her career acting as a training ship. The ship was paid off on 1 April 1994 was scuttled as an artificial reef off Nanaimo, British Columbia.

Yukon had an uneventful career. She spent the majority of her career acting as a training ship and performing general fleet duties, such as port visits. The ship underwent her DELEX refit from 1984–85. The destroyer escort was paid off on 3 December 1993 and was sold to the San Diego Oceans Foundation who intended to scuttle the ship off San Diego, California as an artificial reef. However, before the ceremonial scuttling could take place, ex-Yukon flooded in bad weather and sank the day before at the site. , five people have died while diving on Yukons wreck.

Qu'Appelle also had an uneventful career, used primarily as a training ship and for general fleet duties. She underwent her DELEX refit from 1983–84. She was paid off on 31 July 1992 and sold in 1994 to a Chinese firm for breaking up.

The four Mackenzies were relegated to training duties due to their lack of Variable Depth Sonar, helicopters and lack of modernization. They were replaced in service by the s.

References

Notes

Citations

Sources

External links

 Canadian Navy of Yesterday & Today: Mackenzie class destroyer escort

Destroyer classes